"Can't Get By Without You" was a hit for The Real Thing in 1976. It was the follow up to their smash hit "You to Me Are Everything".

Background
The song was written by Ken Gold and Mickey Denne and released on Pye 7N 45618. The B side, "(He's Just A) Moneymaker" was written by Chris and Eddie Amoo.
The song had a similar feel to their previous hit, but still reached no. 2 in the UK charts, kept from #1 by ABBA's Dancing Queen. It didn't make any real chart impression in the US. On the week ending 16 October 1976, in the UK charts the song had dropped down a notch from no 2 to no 3.

In 1986, a remixed version of the song "Can't Get By Without You (The Second Decade Remix)" by "She's A Groovy Freak" was released on the PRT label.

References

1976 singles
Pye Records singles
The Real Thing (British band) songs
1976 songs
British pop songs